The 2006 Eurocup Mégane Trophy season was the second season of the Renault–supported touring car category, a one-make racing series that is part of the World Series by Renault.. The season began at Circuit Zolder on 29 April and finished at the Circuit de Catalunya on 29 October, after seven rounds and fourteen races. Jaap van Lagen won the title, having battled Matthieu Lahaye for the entire campaign.

Teams and drivers

Race calendar and results

Standings

Drivers' Championship

References

External links
The Eurocup Mégane Trophy website
World Series by Renault results

Eurocup Mégane Trophy seasons
Eurocup Megane Trophy